Ahmed Diane Semega is a Malian politician. He is the former Minister of Mines, Energy and Water, and the current Minister of Infrastructure and Transport.

References

Energy in Mali
Living people
Year of birth missing (living people)
Government ministers of Mali
21st-century Malian people